Michael Krüger (born 9 December 1943, in Wittgendorf) is a German writer, publisher and translator.

Michael Krüger grew up in Berlin. After the graduating he was apprenticed to a publisher and later studied philosophy and literature. From 1962 to 1965 he worked as a bookseller in London.

From 1968 Krüger has worked as an editor at the publishing house Carl Hanser Verlag, and was its editor-in-chief from 1986 to 2014. In 1972 he published his first poems, with his first collection, Reginapoly, appearing in 1976 and his first collection of stories Was tun: Eine altmodische Geschichte (What shall we do: An old-fashioned story) in 1984. Several stories, novels and translations followed. His work has garnered many important accolades including the 1986 Toucan Prize and the 1996 Prix Médicis étranger.

He wrote the introduction to the 2010 New York Review of Books edition of Jakov Lind's Soul of Wood.

Since 1975 Krüger has been a jury member of the European literary award Petrarca-Preis. He is also a juror for the Zbigniew Herbert International Literary Award.

Works

References

External links 

 Interview recording
 Review of The Executor
  Poems at Lyrikline.org

1943 births
Living people
20th-century German novelists
21st-century German novelists
German poets
German translators
German publishers (people)
Members of the Academy of Arts, Berlin
Prix Médicis étranger winners
German male poets
German male novelists
German-language poets
20th-century German male writers
21st-century German male writers
German male non-fiction writers